The Iapa is a right tributary of the river Bistrița in Romania. It flows into the Bistrița in Chintinici near Roznov.

References

Rivers of Romania
Rivers of Neamț County